Ornithoboea is a genus of flowering plants belonging to the family Gesneriaceae.

Its native range is South-Central China to Peninsula Malaysia.

Species
Species:

Ornithoboea arachnoidea 
Ornithoboea barbanthera 
Ornithoboea calcicola 
Ornithoboea emarginata 
Ornithoboea feddei 
Ornithoboea flexuosa 
Ornithoboea grandiflora 
Ornithoboea henryi 
Ornithoboea lacei 
Ornithoboea maxwellii 
Ornithoboea multitorta 
Ornithoboea obovata 
Ornithoboea occulta 
Ornithoboea parishii 
Ornithoboea pseudoflexuosa 
Ornithoboea puglisiae 
Ornithoboea wildeana

References

Didymocarpoideae
Gesneriaceae genera